The 2022 NBL Finals was the championship series of the 2021–22 NBL season and the conclusion of the season.

Format 
The finals was played in April and May 2022 between the top four teams of the regular season, consisting of two best-of-three semi-final and one best-of-five final series, where the higher seed hosts the first, third and fifth games.

Qualification 
The 2022 NBL Finals marked the first time in 35 years that the Perth Wildcats have not qualified for the finals, having last failed to do so in 1986.

Qualified teams

Ladder

Seedings 

 Melbourne United
 Illawarra Hawks
 Sydney Kings
 Tasmania JackJumpers

The NBL tie-breaker system as outlined in the NBL Rules and Regulations states that in the case of an identical win–loss record, the overall points percentage will determine order of seeding.

Playoff Bracket

Semifinals series

(1) Melbourne United vs. (4) Tasmania JackJumpers

(2) Illawarra Hawks vs. (3) Sydney Kings

Grand Final series

(3) Sydney Kings vs. (4) Tasmania JackJumpers

Media coverage

Television 
Australian broadcast rights to the season are held by ESPN. All games are available live on ESPN and the streaming platform Kayo Freebies. Network 10 will broadcast Sunday afternoon games on 10 Peach and 10 Play.

See also 
 2021–22 NBL season
 2021–22 NBL regular season

References

External links 
 

National Basketball League (Australia) Finals
2021–22 NBL season